Steen Skovgaard is a retired male badminton player from Denmark who specialized in the doubles events and won national and international titles in both men's doubles and mixed doubles from the mid-1970s through the early 1980s. He played for the Gentofte BK.

Career
The tall, hard-hitting Skovgaard won the gold medal at the 1977 IBF World Championships in mixed doubles with Lene Køppen, defeating Derek Talbot and Gillian Gilks by 15-12, 18-17 in the final. They also won the bronze medal at the 1980 IBF World Championships.

At the European Badminton Championships they won two silver medals, in 1976 and 1978. In 1980 Skovgaard won a bronze medal in men's doubles with Flemming Delfs, and in 1982 another bronze medal in mixed doubles with his wife, Anne Skovgaard.

Later life
After ending his active career, Skovgaard became a coach in Gentofte BK. He has also been used as a badminton commentator by TV2 Sporten.

He has since 1981 worked for companies such as IBM Denmark, Errpege IBS, Kraks Forklag and Mercuri Urval. In 2004, he became a co-owner of People Capital Partner. In 2010, he became partner in the recruitment company Hansen Toft A/S.

Achievements

World Championships 
Men's doubles

International tournaments 
Men's doubles

References

External links
 Steen Skovgaard - The stars of yesterday - BadmintonDenmark.com
 Steen Skovgaard's Profile - Badminton.dk

Year of birth missing (living people)
Living people
Danish male badminton players
World Games medalists in badminton
World Games bronze medalists
Competitors at the 1981 World Games